Rick Mills (born 1957) is an American glass artist who was born and raised in Marion, Ohio.  He received his bachelor of fine art degree in sculpture from Ohio State University, where the art department reopened its glass program in 1980, during Mills last semester. He moved to Hawai'i in 1981 and earned a master of fine art degree, also in sculpture, from the University of Hawaiʻi at Mānoa, where he is currently professor and director of the glass art program.

His recent works often encapsulate figurative elements in cast glass, as in Once Empty, Twice Full in the collection of the Hawaii State Art Museum. The Glasmuseet Ebeltoft (Ebeltoft, Denmark), the Hawaii State Art Museum, the Honolulu Museum of Art, the Museum of American Glass (Millville, New Jersey), and the Royal College of Art (London) are among the museums holding works by Mills. His creations are permanently installed in these public locations:

Spirit of Loyalty at the University of Hawaiʻi at Mānoa, Queen Lili'uokalani Center for Student Services, cast glass and bronze sculpture, 1995
Reef Map at the Hawaii Convention Center, Ala Halawai Concourse, 3rd floor, glass, copper and stainless steel mural, 12 x 24 feet, 1998
Ka Piko (The Center) at Leilehua High School in Wahiawā, Hawaii, sculptural glass mural, 10 x 16 feet, 2003
Healing Waters at the entrance lobby of the Maui Memorial Medical Center in Kahului, Hawai'i, pair of glass wall sculptures, 11 x 21 feet each, 2007 
Mills is currently (2014) creating a series of five large scale monolithic cast glass sculptures for the new Hawai‘i State Public Library in Mānoa.

References
Clarke, Joan and Diane Dods, Artists/Hawaii, Honolulu, University of Hawai'i Press, 1996, 38–43.
Yoshihara, Lisa A., Collective Visions, 1967-1997, An Exhibition Celebrating the 30th Anniversary of the State Foundation on Culture and the Arts, Art in Public Places Program, Presented at the Honolulu Academy of Arts, September 3-October 12, 1997, Honolulu, State Foundation on Culture and the Arts, 1997, page 99.

Footnotes

1957 births
Living people
20th-century American sculptors
21st-century American sculptors
Artists from Hawaii
Modern sculptors
American glass artists
People from Marion, Ohio
Ohio State University alumni
University of Hawaiʻi at Mānoa alumni